Hemipolygona lamyi is a species of sea snail, a marine gastropod mollusk in the family Fasciolariidae, the spindle snails, the tulip snails and their allies.

Description
The length of the shell attains 74 mm.

Distribution
This marine species occurs off Guadeloupe, Caribbean Sea.

References

 Snyder, M. A., 2007. Description of Hemipolygona lamyi n. sp. from Guadeloupe, French Antilles, Caribbean Sea (Gastropoda: Fasciolariidae: Peristerniinae), with notes on the distribution of Fusinus schrammi. Visaya 2(2): 32-36

Fasciolariidae
Gastropods described in 2007